The New Zealand Warriors 2011 season was the New Zealand Warriors 17th first-grade season. The club competed in Australasia's National Rugby League. The coach of the team is Ivan Cleary while Simon Mannering is the club's captain. The Warriors lost to the Manly Sea Eagles 10-24 in the 2011 NRL Grand Final. The Junior Warriors won the Toyota Cup for the second consecutive year while the Auckland Vulcans finished second in the NSW Cup.

The finals form of the Warriors in 2011 increased the NRL's television audience in New Zealand by 29 per cent this year.

Milestones
12 February – All Stars Match: Feleti Mateo represents the NRL All Stars and Joel Moon represents the Indigenous All Stars in the pre-season All Stars Match.
16 April – Round 6: Micheal Luck played in his 200th National Rugby League match.
4 June – Round 13: Lewis Brown played in his 50th match for the club.
8 July – Round 18: Jacob Lillyman played in his 50th match for the club.
15 July – Round 19: Aaron Heremaia played in his 50th National Rugby League match.
24 July – Round 20: Shaun Berrigan played in his 200th National Rugby League match.
3 September – Round 26: Joel Moon played in his 50th match for the club.
10 September – Qualifying final: Kevin Locke played in his 50th match for the club.
24 September – Preliminary final: James Maloney played in his 50th match for the club.

Jersey and sponsors

Fixtures 

The Warriors opened the season by hosting the Parramatta Eels at Eden Park in Auckland. This was the first time that the Warriors played a home match away from Mount Smart Stadium. The remaining 11 home games were played at Mount Smart Stadium, their only home ground since they entered the competition in 1995.

Pre-season training
The main squad returned to training on 15 November 2010 to start preparing for the 2011 season. Players involved in the 2010 Four Nations and other representative matches returned to training later.

Pre-season matches 
A fourth match was added to the Warriors schedule to raise money for the West Coast region after the Pike River Mine disaster. In a joint partnership with the NZRL, NRL and Newcastle Knights, all money raised was donated to the Pike River mining relief fund and the West Coast Rugby League. The teams arrived early on 3 February to carry out community appearances in the region.

The final trial match against the Manly-Warringah Sea Eagles was also later made a fundraiser match, with North Harbour Stadium donating all profits of the match to the February 2011 Christchurch earthquake victims.

Regular season

Finals

Grand Final

Ladder

Squad 

The Warriors used thirty players during the season. Eight players made their debut for the club, including five who made their NRL debuts.

Staff
Chief executive Officer: Wayne Scurrah
General manager: Don Mann Jr
Recruitment and Development Manager: Dean Bell
High Performance Manager: Craig Walker
High Performance Assistant: Ruben Wiki
Medical Services Manager: John Mayhew
Welfare and Education Manager: Jerry Seuseu
Media and Communications Manager: Richard Becht

NRL staff
NRL Head Coach: Ivan Cleary
NRL Assistant Coach: Tony Iro
NRL Assistant Coach: David Fairleigh
NRL Trainer: Dayne Norton
NRL Physiotherapist: Hamish Craighead

NYC staff
NYC Head Coach & Assistant NRL Coach: John Ackland
NYC Assistant Coach: Frank Harold
NYC Trainer: Andrew Souter
Development Coach: Ricky Henry

Transfers

Gains

Losses

Re-signings

Other teams
In 2011, the Junior Warriors again competed in the Toyota Cup while senior players who were not required for the first team played with the Auckland Vulcans in the NSW Cup.

2011 Auckland Vulcans
The Auckland Vulcans were coached by former Warrior, Richie Blackmore. The Vulcans lost the NSW Cup Grand Final to the Canterbury-Bankstown Bulldogs 28-30.

Grand Final Team: Glen Fisiiahi, Willie Peace, Sione Lousi, Ivan Penehe, Niuvao Taka; Brett Seymour, Pita Godinet; James Gavet, Alehana Mara, Jeremy Latimore; Ukuma Ta'ai, Matt Robinson; Isaac John (c). Interchange: Darin Kingi, Upu Poching, Steve Rapira, Anthony Gelling.

On 18 February the Vulcans announced the following eight-man squad, with a six-man reserve squad. The squad was topped up with Warriors squad members each week.

Upu Poching was the Player of the Year with Darin Kingi named as runner up. Willie Pearce Jnr was named the Rookie of the Year.

2011 Junior Warriors

The Junior Warriors won the Toyota Cup, defeating the North Queensland Cowboys 31-30 in extra time in the Grand Final.

Grand Final Team: George Maka, Adam Henry, Sosaia Feki, Konrad Hurrell, DJ Collier, Carlos Tuimavave, Jordan Meads, Ligi Sao, Eko Malu, Donald Tony, Samiuela Lousi, Ben Henry [c], Sebastine Ikahihifo. Siliva Havili, Agnatius Paasi, Siua Taukeiaho, Toka Likiliki, Siulongua Fotofili, John Palavi.

Along with players from the Melbourne Storm, Cronulla Sharks, Sydney Roosters and Manly Sea Eagles, the new members of the Junior Warriors attended a Toyota Cup Rookie Camp on 11–12 December 2010 which was held in New Zealand for the first time. The camp provided extensive training in media, cultural awareness, drugs and alcohol, social media, money matters, community work, social responsibility and personal presentation.

The Junior Warriors squad was again captained by Ben Henry and included Stephen Shennan, Omar Slaimankhel, Vili Lolohea, Sio Siua Taukeiaho, Konrad Hurrell, Sosaia Feki, James TePou, Carlos Tuimavave, Jordan Meads, Siliva Havili, Henry Chan-Ting, Sam Lousi, Sheldon Brown, Adam Henry, Toka Likiliki, Agnatius Paasi, Lance Su'a-Poe, Anthony Lama, Siulongua Fotofili, Eddie Aki, Donald Tony, Levi Holland, DJ Collier, Sebastine Ikahihifo, Nathaniel Peteru, Sirovai Makatoa, Simon Gibson, Ben Kingi, Falaniko Leilua, Kane Hannan, Eko Malu, John Palavi, Malakai Houma and Chris Ofanoa.

Omar Slaimankhel, Konrad Hurrell, Carlos Tuimavave and coach John Ackland were all named in the Toyota Cup team of the year. John Palavi was named the Vodafone NYC Player of the Year, Siliva Havili won the TNT NYC Young Player of the Year award and Donald Tony was named the DeWalt NYC Club Person of the Year.

Awards
Simon Mannering won the Lion Red Player of the Year award, becoming only the second double winner of the award. Shaun Johnson won the Vodafone NRL Young Player of the Year Award while Jerome Ropati won the Canterbury of New Zealand Club Person of the Year Award and Kevin Locke won the Vodafone People's Choice Award.

References

External links
Warriors official site
Warriors 2011 season rugby league project

New Zealand Warriors seasons
New Zealand Warriors season
war